Gustave Verheyen (6 August 1880 – 9 March 1951) was a South African cricket umpire. He stood in one Test match, South Africa vs. England, in 1928.

See also
 List of Test cricket umpires

References

1880 births
1951 deaths
Sportspeople from Cape Town
South African Test cricket umpires